Brenden Hercules Olivier (born 19 March 1992 in Kareedouw, South Africa) is a South African rugby union player, currently playing with the .

He made his debut for the  against  in April 2012.

References

1992 births
Living people
People from Kou-Kamma Local Municipality
White South African people
South African rugby union players
Eastern Province Elephants players
Rugby union props
Rugby union players from the Eastern Cape